Lunar IceCube is a NASA nanosatellite orbiter mission to prospect, locate, and estimate amount and composition of water ice deposits on the Moon for future exploitation by robots or humans. It was launched as a secondary payload mission on Artemis 1 (formerly known as Exploration Mission 1), the first flight of the Space Launch System (SLS), on 16 November 2022.

Overview 
The lunar mission was designed by Morehead State University and its partners, the Busek Company, NASA Goddard Space Flight Center (GSFC), and The Catholic University of America (CUA). It was selected in April 2015 by NASA's NextSTEP program (Next Space Technologies for Exploration Partnerships) and awarded a contract worth up to US$7.9 million for further development.

It is one of ten CubeSats planned to be carried on board the maiden flight of the SLS, Artemis 1, as secondary payloads in cis-lunar space, in 2022. The principal investigator is Ben Malphrus, Director of the Space Science Center at Morehead State University.

History 
NASA's Lunar Prospector, Clementine, Lunar Crater Observation and Sensing Satellite (LCROSS), the Lunar Reconnaissance Orbiter (LRO) and India's Chandrayaan-1 lunar orbiters and other missions, confirmed both water (H2O) and hydroxyl (—OH−) deposits at high latitudes on the lunar surface, indicating the presence of trace amounts of adsorbed or bound water are present, but their instruments weren't optimized for fully or systematically characterizing the elements in the infrared wavelength bands ideal for detecting water. These missions suggest that there might be enough ice water at polar regions to be used by future landed missions, but the distribution is difficult to reconcile with thermal maps.

Lunar prospecting missions are intended to pave the way toward incorporating use of space resources into mission architectures. NASA's planning for eventual human missions to Mars depends on tapping the local natural resources to make oxygen and propellant for launching the return ship back to Earth, and a lunar precursor mission is a convenient location to test such in situ resource utilization (ISRU) technology.

Goals 
The science goals are to investigate the distribution of water and other volatiles, as a function of time of day, latitude, and lunar soil composition.

Payload 

Lunar IceCube will include a version of the Broadband InfraRed Compact High Resolution Exploration Spectrometer (BIRCHES) instrument, developed by NASA's Goddard Space Flight Center (GSFC). BIRCHES is a compact version of the volatile-seeking spectrometer instrument onboard the New Horizons Pluto flyby mission.

Propulsion 
The tiny CubeSat spacecraft will make use of a miniature electric RF ion engine system based on Busek's 3 centimeter RF ion thruster, also known as BIT-3. It utilizes a solid iodine propellant and an inductively-coupled plasma system that produces 1.1 mN thrust and 2800 seconds specific impulse from approximately 50 watts total input power. It will also use this engine for capture into lunar orbit, and orbit adjustments. It is estimated the spacecraft will take about 3 months to reach the Moon.

Flight software 
The flight software is being developed in SPARK/Ada by the Vermont Technical College Cubesat Laboratory. SPARK/Ada has the lowest error rate of any computer language, important for the reliability and success of this complicated spacecraft. It is used in commercial and military aircraft, air traffic control and high speed trains. This is the second spacecraft using SPARK/Ada, the first being the BasicLEO CubeSat  also by the Vermont Technical College CubeSat Laboratory, the only fully successful university CubeSat out of 12 on the NASA ELaNa-IV launch on U.S. Air Force Operationally Responsive Space-3 (ORS-3) mission.

See also 

The 10 CubeSats flying in the Artemis 1 mission
 Near-Earth Asteroid Scout by NASA was a solar sail spacecraft that was planned to encounter a near-Earth asteroid (mission failure)
 BioSentinel is an astrobiology mission
 LunIR by Lockheed Martin Space
 Lunar IceCube, by the Morehead State University
 CubeSat for Solar Particles (CuSP)
 Lunar Polar Hydrogen Mapper (LunaH-Map), designed by the Arizona State University
 EQUULEUS, submitted by JAXA and the University of Tokyo
 OMOTENASHI, submitted by JAXA, was a lunar lander (mission failure)
 ArgoMoon, designed by Argotec and coordinated by Italian Space Agency (ASI)
 Team Miles, by Fluid and Reason LLC, Tampa, Florida

The 3 CubeSat missions removed from Artemis 1
 Lunar Flashlight will map exposed water ice on the Moon
 Cislunar Explorers, Cornell University, Ithaca, New York
 Earth Escape Explorer (CU-E3), University of Colorado Boulder

References 

CubeSats
Missions to the Moon
NASA space probes
2022 in the United States
Space probes launched in 2022
Secondary payloads
Satellites orbiting the Moon